Sepia reesi is a species of cuttlefish native to the southeastern Indian Ocean. Cuttlebone of this species known only from the type locality.

Sepia reesi grows to a mantle length of 45 mm.

Sepia reesi was only known from the type specimen was collected in Salmon Bay, Rottnest Island, Western Australia but a complete specimen was collected west of Rottnest Island (32º00’S 115º15’E) at a depth of 146-150m. Both the type specimen and the more recent specimen are deposited at the Western Australian Museum in Perth.

The specific epithet reesi honours British researcher William James Rees.

References

External links

Cuttlefish
Molluscs described in 1979